The Men's 20 kilometres walk event at the 2013 European Athletics U23 Championships was held in Tampere, Finland, on 10 July.

Medalists

Results

Final
10 July 2013 

†: Pyotr Bogatyrev ranked initially 1st (1:21:31), but was disqualified later for infringement of IAAF doping rules.

Intermediate times:
2 km: 8:26 Hagen Pohle 
4 km: 16:44 Hagen Pohle 
6 km: 25:02 Pyotr Bogatyrev 
8 km: 33:17 Pyotr Bogatyrev 
10 km: 41:34 Pyotr Bogatyrev 
12 km: 49:52 Pyotr Bogatyrev 
14 km: 58:00 Pyotr Bogatyrev 
16 km: 1:05:58 Pyotr Bogatyrev 
18 km: 1:13:52 Pyotr Bogatyrev

Participation
According to an unofficial count, 24 athletes from 12 countries participated in the event.

References

20 kilometres walk
Racewalking at the European Athletics U23 Championships